Alfred Schläppi (30 January 1898 – 15 April 1981) was a Swiss bobsledder who competed during the early 1920s. He won the gold medal in the four-man event at the 1924 Winter Olympics in Chamonix.

References
Bobsleigh four-man Olympic medalists for 1924, 1932-56, and since 1964
Wallenchinsky, David. (1984). "Bobsled: Four-Man". In The Complete Book the Olympics: 1896-1980. New York: Penguin Books. p. 559.

1898 births
1981 deaths
Bobsledders at the 1924 Winter Olympics
Swiss male bobsledders
Olympic medalists in bobsleigh
Presidents of the Organising Committees for the Olympic Games
Medalists at the 1924 Winter Olympics
Olympic gold medalists for Switzerland